The Rising Hawk (also called Fall Of A Kingdom in the UK) is a 2019 Ukrainian-American historical action film directed by John Wynn and co-directed by Akhtem Seitablayev. It is based on the historical fiction book Zakhar Berkut by Ukrainian writer and poet Ivan Franko. The film premiered on October 10, 2019.

"Berkut" is the name for golden eagle, a type of hawk.

Plot 
During the 13th Century, Zakhar Berkut and his wife Rada lead a group of high-landers in the Carpathian Mountains in a village of Tukhlia (today in Stryi Raion).

Unfortunately, their tranquil existence is soon threatened by Burunda Khan, a powerful Mongolian general who leads his massive armies west in search of new lands to conquer. Forced to protect their village, Zakhar and Rada send their sons, Ivan and Maksym, to ask for help from Tugar Vovk, a wealthy boyar who has recently arrived from King Daniel of Galicia (Kingdom of Rus). After his strong-willed daughter Myroslava and Maksym survive a dangerous encounter together, Tuhar Vovk pledges to defend the villagers against the Mongols. But when a mutual attraction sparks between Myroslava and Maksym, Tugar Vovk forbids them from continuing their relationship. Meanwhile, Burunda Khan faces questions from his warriors about his motivation and military strategy for the impending invasion. As war breaks out, both sides suffer devastating casualties. Redoubling his efforts, Burunda Khan unleashes the full fury of his forces. Faced with certain doom, Maksym and Myroslava must choose to flee or make the ultimate sacrifice to save their people.

Cast

Reception 

On Rotten Tomatoes, the film has an  aggregate score of 29% based on 2 positive and 5 negative critic reviews.

References

External links 
 
 
 https://film.ua/en/news/2027

Ukrainian historical drama films
American historical drama films
Films based on literature
2010s historical drama films
2019 drama films
2019 films
2010s English-language films
Films set in Ukraine
2010s American films